Surf movies fall into three distinct genres:
the surfing documentary - targeting the surfing enthusiast
the 1960s beach party films - targeting the broader community 
fictional feature films with a focus on the reality of surfing

Surfing documentaries 

The earliest-known, footage of people surfing, an actuality film, was lensed by Robert Kates Bonine (Born:14 September 1861, Altoona, PA; Died: 11 September 1923, Honolulu, HI;), beginning 31 May 1906, and at least until 12 August 1906, for Thomas A. Edison, distributed in 1907, called Hawaiian Islands, composed of over thirty segments, of which three segments, Panoramic View - Waikiki Beach Honolulu, Surf Board Riders - Waikiki Honolulu, and Surf Scenes - Waikiki Honolulu, depict people surfing.

The surfing documentary film was pioneered by Bud Browne (e.g. Hawaiian Holiday) in the early 1950s, and later popularized by Bruce Brown (e.g. The Endless Summer) in the late 1950s and early 1960s. They were later advanced by Greg MacGillivray and Jim Freeman (e.g. Five Summer Stories) in the 1970s and beyond (MacGillivray and Freeman later went on to film IMAX movies such as To Fly! and Speed).  The genre itself has been defined by surfers traveling with their friends and documenting the experience on film.  In the era of Bruce Brown, Greg Noll, Bud Browne, John Severson and others, films were projected for fans in music halls, civic centers, high school gyms, coffee houses, and high school auditoriums.

During the 1980s, the market for surf films surged with the release of more affordable video cameras. By the 1990s, the surfing market became saturated with low and medium budget surf films, many with sound tracks that reflected the surf music. VHS and DVDs made the surf film viewing experience an "at home" affair, and the era of joining friends or taking a girl to "surf movie night" at the local high school soon waned.  Furthermore, large surf brands began sponsoring surf films to promote clothing and product sales.  Titles like Sonny Miller's, The Search for Rip Curl redefined the genre with exotic locales, big budgets and name surfers, such as Tom Curren.

In the late 1990s to the present, there has been a revival of the "independent surf film."  Artists, like The Malloys, Jack Johnson (musician) and Jason Baffa have reinvented the genre by shooting self-financed 16mm motion picture film and utilizing indy music bands like G. Love, Alexi Murdoch, Mojave 3, White Buffalo and Donavon Frankenreiter, creating what the surf media has called, "modern classics."  Some venues still screen surfing films on the big screen.

Examples of surfing documentaries include:
 
Hawaiian Islands (1906)
Surfing, National Sport in the Hawaiian Islands (1911) 
Burton Holmes’ Hawaiian Shores (1921)
Topical Budget 884-2 Bucking the Waves (1928)
Pictorial Sportreel: Riding the Crest (1939)
Surfboard Rhythm (1947)
Thrills of the Surf (1949)
Surfing Daze (1949)
Slippery When Wet (1958)
Surf Crazy (1959)
Honolulu Surfing Daze (1959)
Barefoot Adventure (1960)
Surfing Hollow Days (1961)
Waterlogged (1962)
Gone With the Wave (1964)
King of the Wild Waves (1964) 
The Living Curl (1965)
The Endless Summer (1966)
The Moods of Surfing (1967)
The Fantastic Plastic Machine (1969)
 The Innermost Limits of Pure Fun (1970)
Five Summer Stories (1972)
Morning of the Earth (1973)
 Crystal Voyager (1973)
Tubular Swells (1975)
Storm Riders (1982)
Momentum (1992)
Endless Summer II (1994)
The Kill (1993)
Thicker than Water (2000)
September Sessions (2000)
The Endless Summer: Revisited (2000)
Liquid Time (2002)
Surf Movie: reels 1-14 (2003)
 Blue Horizon (2003)
Step Into Liquid (2003)
Glass Love (2004)
Riding Giants (2004)
Somewhere, Anywhere, Everywhere (2004)
Singlefin: yellow (2004)
The Seedling (2004)
AKA Girl Surfer (2004)
Billabong Odyssey (2005)
Fair Bits (2005)
Going With The Flow: Classic California Soul Surfing (2005)
Sprout (2005)
A Broke Down Melody (2006)
Free As A Dog (2006)
Peel: The Peru Project - A Surf Odyssey (2006)
The Secret Machine (2006)
One California Day (2007)
Sipping Jetstreams (2007)
The Forgotten Coast (2007)
Bustin' Down the Door (2008)
New Emissions of Light and Sound (2008)
Live: A Music & Surfing Experience (2008)
Water man (2008)
Waveriders (2008)
Out of Place (2009)
The Present (2009)
Fiberglass and Megapixels (2010)
First Love (2010)
God Went Surfing With The Devil (2010)
White Wash
Year Zero (2011)
Drift (2012)
Here & Now: A Day in the Life of Surfing (2012)
Strange Rumblings in Shangri-LA (2014)
View from a Blue Moon (2015)
 Bethany Hamilton: Unstoppable (2018)
Self Discovery for Social Survival (2019)
In The Water, Behind The Lens (2022)

Beach Party films 
The second type of surf movie would be the campy entertainment feature, also termed "beach party films" or "surfploitation flicks" by true surfers, having little to do with the authentic sport and culture of surfing and representing movies that attempted to cash in on the growing popularity of surfing among youth in the early 1960s. Examples of Beach Party films include:

 
Gidget (1959)
Gidget Goes Hawaiian (1961)
Beach Party (1963)
Ride the Wild Surf (1964)
Surf Party (1964)
Beach Blanket Bingo (1965)
Malibu Beach (1978)
The Beach Girls (1982)
Spring Break (1983)
Hardbodies (1984)
Back to the Beach (1987)
Teen Beach Movie (2013)

Narrative Surf Films
Surfing is occasionally portrayed more realistically within fictional storylines, or used as a backdrop, or side theme.

 
Big Wednesday (1978)
Puberty Blues (1981)
Surf II (1984)
North Shore (1987)
Surf Nazis Must Die (1987)
Point Break (1991)
A Scene at the Sea (1991)
Surf Ninjas (1993)
Blue Juice (1995)
In God's Hands (1998)
Blue Crush (2002)
Local Boys (2002)
Lords Of Dogtown (2005)
Surf's Up (2007)
Soul Surfer (2011)
Blue Crush 2 (2011)
Chasing Mavericks (2012)
Drift (film) (2013)
The Perfect Wave (2014)
Point Break (2015)
The Pro (Die Pro) (2015)
Surf's Up 2: WaveMania (2017)

See also
 Ski film

Sources 
 Booth, Douglas (1996) "Surfing Films and Videos: Adolescent Fun, Alternative Lifestyle, Adventure Industry" Journal of Sport History 
 Thoms, Albie (2000) Surfmovies: The History of the Surf Film in Australia 
 Lisanti, Tom (2005) Hollywood Surf And Beach Movies: The First Wave, 1959-1969 
 Warshaw, Matt (2005) Surf Movie Tonite!: Surf Movie Poster Art, 1957-2004 San Francisco: Chronicle Books 
 Williams, Randy (2006) Sports Cinema 100 Movies: The Best of Hollywood's Athletic Heroes, Losers, Myths, and Misfits Limelight Editions  pg 134-136
 Chidester, Brian; Priore, Domenic; Zuckerman, Kathy (2008) Pop Surf Culture: Music, Design, Film, and Fashion from the Bohemian surf boom Santa Monica Press  Chapter 7
 Ormrod & Wheaton (2009) On the edge: leisure, consumption and the representation of adventure sports Leisure Studies Association Issue 104: 17-25
 Engle, John (2015) Surfing in the Movies: A Critical History McFarland 
 JONES, DAVIS (2017) “History Of Surfing: Bud Browne Goes To The Movies” Surfer
 MacGillivray, Greg (2019) “The evolution of the surf film” Surfer Today

References

External links
Surf Film Filmography at montjuichboards.com
Surf Movies .org
1920’s film clip at University of Hawaii

 
Film genres
Film